A workaround is a bypass of a recognized problem or limitation in a system or policy. A workaround is typically a temporary fix that implies that a genuine solution to the problem is needed. But workarounds are frequently as creative as true solutions, involving outside the box thinking in their creation.

Typically they are considered brittle in that they will not respond well to further pressure from a system beyond the original design. In implementing a workaround it is important to flag the change so as to later implement a proper solution.

Placing pressure on a workaround may result in later system failures. For example, in computer programming workarounds are often used to address a problem or anti-pattern in a library, such as an incorrect return value. When the library is changed, the workaround may break the overall program functionality, effectively becoming an anti-pattern, since it may expect the older, wrong behaviour from the library.

Workarounds can also be a useful source of ideas for improvement of products or services.

Legal workarounds 

When the legal system places an obstacle in the form of a restriction or requirement, the law may provide a possible workaround. Laws intended to tap into what may seem to be deep pockets may lead to what are at least
temporary solutions such as:
 Since "most French workplace laws affect businesses with 50 or more employees... many French companies opt to employ only 49 people in avoidance of crippling legislations."
 An injunction against Microsoft regarding XML features and an easy technical workaround, a patent attorney suggested having two versions of MS Word, one with and one without the feature.

Acronyms 

Some well-known acronyms were created to work around bureaucratic or contracting restrictions:
 PDP - The term was used to describe a computer by another name, due to contracting complications for purchasing or leasing computers.  The term PDP (Programmed Data Processor or Programmable Data Processor) was a workaround. The name "PDP" intentionally avoids the use of the term "computer". PDPs were aimed at a market that could not afford larger computers.
 GNU - GNU's Not UNIX. As AT&T's prices for academic licensing and use of UNIX increased, new restrictions on maximum number of concurrent users and limitations on types of use created a motivation for an alternative: a work-alike workaround. Among the better known ones are:
 Linux
 BSD
 System V
 PSAP. By contrast with hearing aids, the sale of which is more regulated and more expensive, a Personal Sound Amplification Product (PSAP) is lower in price albeit more limited in capability.

See also 

 Bug
 Coping skill
 Design around
 Hack
 Jury rig
 Kludge
 Planned obsolescence
 Preventive maintenance
 Program temporary fix (PTF)

References

Software quality
Software maintenance